Polyocha is a genus of snout moths. It was described by Philipp Christoph Zeller in 1848.

Species
 Polyocha anerastiodes Warren & Rothschild, 1905
 Polyocha anomalella  Janse, 1922
 Polyocha depressellus (Swinhoe, 1885
 Polyocha ereboctena  Meyrick, 1935
 Polyocha flagrantella Ragonot, 1901
 Polyocha foucarti Ragonot, 1887
 Polyocha fuscicostella Hampson, 1918
 Polyocha largella Caradja, 1925
 Polyocha leucopleurella (Ragonot, 1888)
 Polyocha monochromella Ragonot, 1888
 Polyocha neuropterella Ragonot, 1887
 Polyocha plinthocroa Hampson, 1918
 Polyocha rhodesiae  Strand, 1909
 Polyocha sanguinariella Zeller, 1848
 Polyocha subfasciatella Ragonot, 1887
 Polyocha venosa (Zeller, 1847)
 Polyocha vesculella

References

External links
 "Polyocha Zeller, 1848" at AfroMoths. Retrieved June 14, 2017.

Anerastiini
Pyralidae genera
Taxa named by Philipp Christoph Zeller